Loxostege virescalis is a species of moth of the family Crambidae described by Achille Guenée in 1854. It is found in parts of Europe, including France, Germany, Switzerland, Austria, Croatia, Bulgaria and Hungary.

External links
 European distribution

Pyraustinae
Moths of Europe